Princeton is a given name. Notable people with the name include:

Princeton Kwong (born 1989), American figure skater
Princeton Lyman (1935–2018), American diplomat
Princeton Owusu-Ansah (born 1976), Ghanaian footballer